Comités Abertos de Estudantes (CAE, Students Open Committees in English) was a Galician nationalist and left-wing student union, formed by high school, bachillerato and professional formation students. On May 10, 2008, CAE dissolved itself to form, along with the Comités Abertos de Faculdade (CAF), a new student union, Comités.

The organization was founded in 1990 as an extension to the middle school of the CAF project, coinciding with the elections to the Galician School Board.

References

 Beramendi, X.G. (2007): De provincia a nación. Historia do galeguismo político. Xerais, Vigo
 Various authors (2002). 25 anos da UMG (1977-2002): A paixón por transformar. Edicións Terra e Tempo, Santiago de Compostela. Authorized internet version here. Pages 59 to 63.

Secessionist organizations in Europe
1990 establishments in Spain
Galician nationalism
Socialism